Ormaig may refer to:
 Ormaig, Tasmania, an administrative division of Tasmania
 Ormaig, a former settlement on the Isle of Ulva
 Ormaig, Argyll; see Knapdale